Defending champions Dylan Alcott and Andy Lapthorne defeated Sam Schröder and David Wagner in the final, 3–6, 6–4, [10–8] to win the quad doubles wheelchair tennis title at the 2020 US Open.

Draw

Bracket

References

External links 
 Draw

Wheelchair Quad Doubles
U.S. Open, 2020 Quad Doubles